Toy Vault and is an American company founded in 1998 that designs and manufactured plush toys, plush apparel, board games and other novelty items.

Perhaps best known for their Monty Python toys, Toy Vault also holds licenses for such properties as Godzilla, The Princess Bride, Jim Henson's Labyrinth, Kiss, Firefly, Trigun and others.

The Lord of the Rings 
Three months after its inception in 1998, Toy Vault acquired a license from Tolkien Enterprises to produce plastic action figures based on The Lord of the Rings.  This was the first series of action figures produced based purely on a literary property.

Current and previous product lines

Licensed
 Firefly
 Monty Python
 Godzilla
 The Princess Bride (film)
 Dark Crystal
 Jim Henson's Labyrinth
 Farscape
 Rubik's Cube plush
 The Lord of the Rings
 Alice In Wonderland
 Astro City
 Dork Tower
 Knights of the Dinner Table
 Conker
 Cabbage Patch Kids children's furniture
 KISS
 Swearbears
 Shin chan
 Trigun
 SpongeBob SquarePants

Unlicensed
 Cthulhu Mythos
 Richard Borg's Abaddon (board game)
 Zombies Afoot! Plush Slippers
 Vault Gaming Supplies

References

Toy companies of the United States
Corbin, Kentucky
Companies based in Kentucky
1998 establishments in Kentucky
Companies established in 1998